Nargis Akhter is a Bangladeshi film director, screenwriter and producer. Her first directed film was Meghla Akash. After her first film, she directed various films including Megher Koley Rod (2008), Abujh Bou (2010), and Poush Maser Pirit (2016). 

She won twice National Film Award for the Best Screenplay category for the film Meghla Akash and Abujh Bou. She is the first Bangladeshi woman to receive national and international film awards.

Early life 
Akhter was born in Dhaka Medical College Hospital. Her ancestral home is in Madaripur. She graduated from Dhaka University with a degree in  social welfare. She gained early experience making television documentaries for a development organization. Her first, Ajana Ghatak, on the subject of HIV AIDS, was broadcast in 1996.

Filmography

Television

Awards 
National Film Awards

References

External links
 

Living people
Bangladeshi film directors
Bangladeshi women film directors
Bangladeshi screenwriters
Best Screenplay National Film Award (Bangladesh) winners
University of Dhaka alumni
People from Madaripur District
Year of birth missing (living people)